Lir Abi (also Romanized as Līr Ābī) is a village in Dinaran Rural District of the Central District of Ardal County, Chaharmahal and Bakhtiari province, Iran. At the 2006 census, its population was 870 in 154 households. The following census in 2011 counted 955 people in 160 households. The latest census in 2016 showed a population of 1,189 people in 284 households; it was the largest village in its rural district.

References 

Ardal County

Populated places in Chaharmahal and Bakhtiari Province

Populated places in Ardal County